VfL Wolfsburg did not manage to qualify for international football, in spite of keeping the squad that won the Bundesliga in 2009. Coach Armin Veh was sacked, following a failure to reach the knockout stage of the UEFA Champions League, and being distanced in Bundesliga. Under interim coach Lorenz-Günther Köstner Wolfsburg managed to finish inside the top half and reach the quarter final in the UEFA Europa League. The most influential player was Edin Džeko, who unlike the team, continued to perform at the top level, topping the Bundesliga's top scoring-chart.

Squad

Goalkeepers
  Diego Benaglio
  André Lenz
  Marwin Hitz

Defenders
  Andrea Barzagli
  Alexander Madlung
  Ricardo Costa
  Marcel Schäfer
  Cristian Zaccardo
  Peter Pekarík
  Réver
  Fabian Johnson
  Daniel Reiche
  Jan Šimůnek

Midfielders
  Sascha Riether
  Christian Gentner
  Zvjezdan Misimović
  Ashkan Dejagah
  Makoto Hasebe
  Josué
  Jonathan Santana
  Karim Ziani
  Sebastian Schindzielorz
  Alexander Laas
  Daniel Baier

Attackers
  Grafite
  Edin Džeko
  Obafemi Martins
  Alexander Esswein

Competitions

Bundesliga

League table

Matches

Top scorers
  Edin Džeko (22)
  Grafite (11)
  Zvjezdan Misimović (10)
  Obafemi Martins (6)

Top assists
  Zvjezdan Misimović (15)
  Edin Džeko (10)

DFB-Pokal

UEFA Champions League

Group stage

UEFA Europa League

Knockout phase

Round of 32

Round of 16

Quarter-finals

Kits

References

Sources
  Soccerbase - Wolfsburg Results

VfL Wolfsburg seasons
Wolfsburg